{{DISPLAYTITLE:C14H16N2O3}}
The molecular formula C14H16N2O3 (molar mass: 260.29 g/mol, exact mass: 260.1161 u) may refer to:

 Nadoxolol
 Phetharbital, or phenetharbital

Molecular formulas